Daniel Bartlett Allyn (born September 24, 1959) is a retired United States Army general who served as the 35th Vice Chief of Staff of the United States Army from 2014 until 2017. Allyn previously served as the commanding general of the XVIII Airborne Corps from 2012 to 2013 and of United States Army Forces Command from May 2013 to August 2014.

Early life and education
Allyn was born in New Hampshire on September 24, 1959, and raised in Berwick, Maine. He graduated from the United States Military Academy at West Point, New York in 1981.

Career
Allyn went on to serve overseas in South Korea, Grenada, Egypt, Panama, Saudi Arabia, Kuwait, Iraq and Afghanistan as a combat infantryman and a master parachutist.

Awards and decorations

Other
In 2013, Allyn was the honoree of the Patriot Foundation, an organization that provides scholarships and other support to the families of soldiers who have served in airborne, special operations and other army specialty units.

References

External links

 Vice Chief of Staff of the United States Army
 Allyn promoted, becomes 20th commanding general of U.S. Army Forces Command
 Maj. Gen. Joseph Anderson nominated to command Fort Bragg, 18th Airborne Corps 

1959 births
 Living people
 United States Military Academy alumni
 United States Army generals
United States Army personnel of the Gulf War
United States Army personnel of the Iraq War
United States Army personnel of the War in Afghanistan (2001–2021)
Recipients of the Distinguished Service Medal (US Army)
 Recipients of the Silver Star
 Recipients of the Legion of Merit
 People from Berwick, Maine
 Naval War College alumni
 United States Army Command and General Staff College alumni
 United States Army Vice Chiefs of Staff